Leopoldo Pollack (1751 – 13 March 1806) was an Austrian-born Italian architect who was active in Milan where he became one of the leading proponents of Neoclassical architecture.

Career

In Vienna, Pollack was trained by Paul Ulrich Trientl before attending courses at the Academy under Vinzenz Fischer. After arriving in Milan in 1775, he became a pupil of Giuseppe Piermarini with whom he also collaborated.  His most famous work is the Royal Villa or Villa Belgiojoso (1790–1796), one of Milan's most important Neoclassical buildings. Clearly influenced by Palladianism and French trends, it has a rusticated base, a giant order of columns and is topped with a series of statues. Pollack also designed the English garden behind the mansion. His elevations are inspired by Ange-Jacques Gabriel's Place de la Concorde although he used Ionic rather than Corinthian columns.

Pollack also collaborated with Piermarini on designing what is now the physics laboratory at the University of Pavia, completed in 1787, which includes a series of Ionic semi-columns and niches with statues of Galileo Galilei and Bonaventura Cavalieri.

Other works include the Villa Casati in Muggiò and the Villa Rocca-Saporti (also known as the Rotonda) in Via Borgo Vico, Como, both completed in the 1790s, and the Villa Amalia in Erba.

See also
Neoclassical architecture in Milan

References

Bibliography

Micaela Pisaroni, Il neoclassicismo - Itinerari di Milano e Provincia, 1999, Como, NodoLibri, p. 27 et seq. 

18th-century Italian architects
Architects from Milan
Italian neoclassical architects
1751 births
1806 deaths
Architects from Vienna